Mecinus pascuorum is a species of true weevil in the family of beetles known as Curculionidae.

References

Further reading

External links

 

Curculioninae
Beetles described in 1813